Markovits is a Magyarised South-Slavic surname. It may refer to the following people:

 Andrei Markovits (born 1948), Romanian political scientist
 Inga Markovits (born 1937), American lawyer 
 Kálmán Markovits (1931–2009), Hungarian water polo player
 László Markovits (born 1970), Hungarian tennis player
 Rodion Markovits (1888–1948), Austro-Hungarian-born writer, journalist and lawyer

See also 
 Markov
 Marković
 Markovics
 Markovski
 Markovsky
 Markowitz
 Markowski

Hungarian-language surnames
Slavic-language surnames
Jewish surnames
Patronymic surnames